AFC Academy is a football club from Turks and Caicos. They play in the Turks and Caicos first division, the WIV Provo Premier League.

Current squad 
Squad for the 2019-20 WIV Provo Premier League

Staff

Achievements
WIV Provo Premier League: 4
2009–10, 2014, 2014–15, 2016

References

Football clubs in the Turks and Caicos Islands
2007 establishments in the Turks and Caicos Islands
Association football clubs established in 2007